Émile Leon Jacques Dupont (8 June 1887 – 18 March 1959) was a Belgian sport shooter who competed in the 1920 Summer Olympics and in the 1924 Summer Olympics.

He was born and died in Liège. In 1911, he was married to Marthe Dupont-Trasenster, a Belgian Olympic tennis player who also represented Belgium at the 1920 and 1924 Summer Olympics.

In 1920, he won the silver medal as member of the Belgian team in the team clay pigeons competition. In the individual trap event he finished ninth. Four years later he was part of the Belgian team which finished fourth in the team clay pigeons competition. He also participated in the individual trap event but his result is unknown.

References

External links 

1887 births
1959 deaths
Belgian male sport shooters
Olympic shooters of Belgium
Shooters at the 1920 Summer Olympics
Shooters at the 1924 Summer Olympics
Olympic silver medalists for Belgium
Trap and double trap shooters
Olympic medalists in shooting
Sportspeople from Liège
Medalists at the 1920 Summer Olympics
20th-century Belgian people